Jepson is an English language patronymic surname meaning "Geoffrey’s son".  The prefix "Jep" is also the diminutive given name. Jepson has alternate spellings, including Jepsen and Jephson. Jepson as a given name is rare.

People with the surname Jepson include:
 Arthur Jepson (1915–1997), English first-class cricketer and football goalkeeper
 Benjamin Jepson (1832–1914), American music educator
 Bert Jepson (1902–1981), footballer
 Brian Jepson (born 1970), American voice actor
 Duncan Jepson, British solicitor in Hong Kong
 Edgar Jepson (1863–1938), English novelist
 Harry Benjamin Jepson (1870–1952), American organist and composer
 Harry Jepson (1920–2016), English rugby league player
 Helen Jepson (1904–1997), American opera singer
 Herbert Jepson (1908–1993), American artist and founder of the Jepson Art Institute 
 Jack Jepson, New Zealand footballer
 James Jepson Binns (1855–1928), English pipe-organ builder
 Jim Jepson (1942–1989), Canadian politician
 Joanna Jepson (born 1976), English Church of England curate
 Kristine Jepson (1962–2017), American opera singer
 Margaret Jepson (1907–2003), English writer
 Robert S. Jepson Jr. (born 1942), American philanthropist and businessman
 Ronnie Jepson (born 1963), English footballer
 Selwyn Jepson (1899–1989), British author, screenwriter and director
 Steven B. Jepson (born 1960), American opera singer
 Toby Jepson (born 1967), English musician and actor
 Tristan Jepson (1978–2004), Australian writer
 Vicky Jepson (born 1988), English footballer
 Warner Jepson (1930–2011), American composer
 Willis Linn Jepson (1867–1946), American botanist

See also
 Belita, Olympic figure skater, dancer and early film actress Maria Belita Gladys Olivie Lynn Jepson-Turner (1923–2005)
 Peter Jepson-Young (born 1957), Canadian AIDS-awareness educator
 Jepson (disambiguation), for other uses
 Jepsen
 Jepsonia

References

English-language surnames
Patronymic surnames